Luís Carlos Martins (born 8 August 1955) is a Brazilian professional football coach, currently in charge of Noroeste.

Career
In 1986, he was a head coach of the Rio Branco de Americana. Since 1992 he coached the clubs: Guaçuano, Paraguaçuense, Noroeste, Matonense, União Barbarense, São Caetano, Portuguesa, Santo André, Oeste, Mirassol, Marília, América-RN, Vila Nova, Remo, Sertãozinho, Guaratinguetá, Pão de Açúcar, São Bernardo, Paulista, Juventude and São Caetano

Honours
Rio Branco
 Campeonato Paulista Série A3: 1986

Oeste
 Campeonato Brasileiro Série C: 2012

São Caetano
 Campeonato Paulista Série A2: 2017

References

External links

1955 births
Living people
Sportspeople from São Paulo
Brazilian football managers
Campeonato Brasileiro Série C managers
Campeonato Brasileiro Série D managers
Rio Branco Esporte Clube managers
Esporte Clube Noroeste managers
Sociedade Esportiva Matonense managers
União Agrícola Barbarense Futebol Clube managers
Associação Desportiva São Caetano managers
Associação Portuguesa de Desportos managers
Esporte Clube Santo André managers
Oeste Futebol Clube managers
Mirassol Futebol Clube managers
Marília Atlético Clube managers
América Futebol Clube (RN) managers
Vila Nova Futebol Clube managers
Clube do Remo managers
Sertãozinho Futebol Clube managers
Guaratinguetá Futebol managers
São Bernardo Futebol Clube managers
Paulista Futebol Clube managers
Esporte Clube Juventude managers
Fortaleza Esporte Clube managers